Bueso is a surname. Notable people with the surname include:

David Bueso (born 1955), Honduran footballer
Eduardo Bueso, Honduran politician
Francisco Bueso (1860–?), Honduran politician
José Bueso Rosa, Honduran general and trafficker
José Santiago Bueso (1815-1857), Honduran politician
Orlando Bueso (born 1974), Honduran footballer
Pol Bueso (born 1985), Spanish footballer 
Ricardo Bueso, Guatemalan businessman and politician
Rosalinda Bueso (born 1977), Honduran diplomat